Year 2021 is a major year in Myanmar, particularly after the February 1 coup d'état. As hundreds of thousands of Myanmar citizens held major protests across Myanmar, the military junta cracked down on protesters. These crackdowns later turned violent and caused the deaths of more than 700 people across Myanmar. The aftermath of the coup caused a severe deterioration on the security and condition of the country, with United Nations describing it as "near civil war-like".

Incumbents

Prior to coup d'état

After coup d'etat

Events

January to February 
 30 January – Hundreds of military supporters rallied in Yangon after claiming frauds on the outcome of the 2020 Burmese general election. 
 1 February 
 Myanmar General Min Aung Hlaing deposed elected leader of civilian government Aung San Suu Kyi from her position and decided to arrest members of civilian government after claiming multiple frauds on the 2020 Burmese general election.
 Following the coup, military junta announced a one year period of national emergency.
 2 February – Small protests sporadically appear across the country following the coup d'état on the previous day.
 5 February – Members of the deposed Burmese parliament formed a new committee to represent as "the legitimate government of the Burmese people".
 6 February – Thousands of people poured onto the street in Yangon and multiple cities across Myanmar to denounce the coup d'état on 1st of February, marking the first large-scale protest since the coup.
 8 February – Martial law declared by military following major protests across Myanmar.
 10 February – Myanmar military junta began to crack down on protesters.
 15 February – Military authorities imposed a daily internet outage from 01:00 am to 09.00 am local time.
 19 February – 20-year old Mya Thwe Thwe Khine died after being shot by Myanmar security forces, the first death since the coup.
 28 February – At least 18 protesters were killed after Myanmar police opened fire on crowds.

March to April 
 3 March – At least 38 protesters were shot dead by security forces following violent crackdown across Myanmar.
 9 March – Myanmar military shut down independent medias in its latest attempt of cracking down dissents.
 14 March – International condemnations after multiple businesses were set on fire and scores of protesters were shot dead across Myanmar in one of the deadliest day since the coup.
 17 March – CRPH removed every armed ethnic groups, except the military junta, from its terrorist groups designation.
 27 March – Massacre of hundreds of Burmese protesters during the annual Myanmar Armed Forces Day drew international condemnations and new economic sanctions on members of the military junta.
 2 April – CRPH abolished the 2008 Myanmar Constitution and created the Federal Democracy Charter as a legal basis for a Democratic Union in Myanmar.
 10 April – Over 80 protesters were killed in the Burmese city of Bago after Myanmar military shot rifle grenades onto crowds.
 16 April – CRPH announced the formation of National Unity Government (NUG).
 24 April – ASEAN held talks with Burmese military junta and UN envoy in Jakarta to discuss over the deteriorating condition in Myanmar. Multiple agreements were later announced.
 26 April – Heavy fighting erupted after members of Karen National Union stormed a military outpost near Myanmar - Thai border.

May to June 
 3 May – Kachin Independence Army shot down a military helicopter in Kachin State, killing all aboard.
 4 May – Japanese journalist Yuki Kitazumi was charged by the military junta for spreading false news, the first foreign journalist to be charged by the military junta since the coup.
 5 May 
 Myanmar military junta bans satellite dish.
 National Unity Government of Myanmar announced the establishment of People's Defense Force.
 6 May – More than 200 rights groups called on the United Nations Security Council to impose arms embargo on Myanmar.
 8 May 
 The Arakan National Council announced that its Kayin State-based Arakan Army would join the Karen National Liberation Army in its fight against the Burmese military junta.
 Ruling military junta rejected ASEAN plans to visit the country, citing the nation's troubling stability as the reason.
 State-media announced that National Unity Government of Myanmar would be designated as a terrorist group, blaming the group for the recent turmoil in the country.
 14 May - Martial law declared in Mindat, Chin State as rebels step up attack against Myanmar military troops.
 16 May - Myanmar military recaptured Mindat after local militias retreated from the town.
 21 May - Burmese electoral commission dissolves National League for Democracy (NLD) Party for "alleged voting fraud" in the 2020 election.
 27 May - Energy giants Total and Chevron announced suspension of payments for the Burmese military junta due to killings of protesters.
 29 May - Ministry of Health and Sports imposes social restrictions after rise in COVID-19 cases.
 10 June 
 Burmese authorities charged Aung San Suu Kyi for alleged corruption.
 A military plane carrying at least 14 passengers and crew members crashed in Mandalay, killing 12 people including one the nation's most influential monks, Abhisheka Maha Rattha Guru Bhatanda Kavisara.                                 
 22 June - Clashes between local People Defense Force and the Tatmadaw erupt in Mandalay. 
 28 June - Rebels  reportedly killed 30 Burmese military officers in Falam and Hakha, Chin State.

July to August 
 2 July - At least 30 people, including rebels, were killed and 10,000 people were displaced after Burmese military junta raided a village in Depayin Township, Sagaing Region.
 4 July - Clashes broke out between local People's Defence Forces and Burmese military junta in Kawlin Township, Sagaing, killing at least 22. 
 10 July - Heavy clashes between Kachin Independence Army and Burmese military junta were reported in Hpakant Township, Kachin State.
 13 July - Local villagers discovered 15 bodies with signs of torture in Kani Township, Sagaing.
 23 July - Myanmar military launches surprise attack on rebels in Mindat Township, Chin State. More than 20,000 people have been displaced by the fighting.
 26 July - More than 800 villagers were forced to flee from their homes after military junta raided a village and burned houses in Falam Township, Chin State.
 28 July - Massive flood swept through Southeast Myanmar, forcing hundreds to evacuate.
 3 August - COVID-19 death toll in Myanmar surpass 310,000 as cases skyrocket.
 7 August - Myanmar military junta officially asked for assistance from neighboring countries after spike in COVID-19 cases caused healthcare crisis in the country.
 8 August - Burmese military leader Min Aung Hlaing announced plans for holding an election by 2023.
 12 - 13 August - Floods and landslides batter the city of Mogok, killing four people.
 25 August - Resistance fighters ambushed junta soldiers in Magwe, killing 30 people.

September to October
 7 September 
 Acting President of National Unity Government Duwa Lashi La announced a "declaration of war" on Myanmar military junta and urged Burmese citizens to revolt.
 Resistance forces clash with military troops in multiple areas in Tanintharyi.

November to December
 5 December – a military truck rams into a group of protestors, injuring several people.
 22 December - 2021 Hpakant jade mine disaster

References

Myanmar
2021 in Asia
2021 in Myanmar